Wilfred Kitching CBE (22 August 1893 – 15 December 1977) was a British Salvation Army officer who was their 7th General between 1954 and 1963.

Biography

Born in Wood Green, London, to Theodore and Jane Kitching (née Cranshaw); his father was also a Salvation Army officer. Wilfred attended Friern Barnet Grammar School. He became a Salvation Army Officer at age 20 in 1914. He would serve over 30 years in corps, divisional and National Headquarters appointments, and the British Territory.

He and Adjutant Kathleen Bristow were married in 1929. In 1946, he was sent to serve in Australia South as Chief Secretary. He was sent to Sweden to serve as Territorial Commander in 1948. In 1951, he became British Commissioner.

The Commissioner was elected General of The Salvation Army by the High Council in 1954. During his years as an officer, he wrote many songs in The Salvation Army song book. In 1961, he was awarded a Hon. LLD in Yonsei, Korea, and CBE in 1964. He also wrote two books, Soldier of Salvation (1963), and his autobiography, A Goodly Heritage (1967). General Kitching retired on 22 November 1963.

General Wilfred Kitching died at the age of 84. He is buried in New Camberwell Cemetery.

References

External links
 Wilfred Kitching at The Salvation Army

1893 births
1977 deaths
English Salvationists
Christian writers
Commanders of the Order of the British Empire
Salvation Army officers
People educated at Friern Barnet Grammar School